Evan Thomas Spiegel (born June 4, 1990) is an American (naturalized French in 2018) businessman, co-founder and CEO of Snap Inc. Spiegel was the youngest billionaire in the world in 2015. As of March 2023, he had a personal net worth of $2.7 billion according to Forbes.

Early life and education
Spiegel was born in Los Angeles, California, to lawyers John W. Spiegel and Melissa Ann Thomas. He grew up in Pacific Palisades, California, where he was raised Episcopalian. He was educated at the Crossroads School for Arts and Sciences in Santa Monica, and attended Stanford University.

Spiegel took design classes at the Otis College of Art and Design while still in the high school and at the Art Center College of Design in Pasadena the summer before entering Stanford. He also had an unpaid internship in sales at Red Bull. While a student, he worked as a paid intern for a biomedical company, as a careers instructor in Cape Town, South Africa, and at Intuit on the TxtWeb project. Spiegel is a member of the Kappa Sigma fraternity.

Career

In April 2011, Spiegel proposed an app with ephemeral messaging as a product design class project. Later that year, Spiegel worked with fellow Stanford classmates Bobby Murphy and Reggie Brown to launch a prototype of this concept called "Picaboo", which they later renamed as Snapchat. The app's popularity grew significantly and in 2012, Spiegel left Stanford to focus on Snapchat shortly before completing his degree. By the end of 2012, Spiegel's Snapchat app had reached 1 million daily active users. He later completed his remaining credits and graduated in 2018.
 

In February 2017, Spiegel and Murphy pledged to donate upwards of 13,000,000 shares of Class A common stock over the next 15–20 years to an arts, education and youth non-profit. They have created the Snap Foundation which is a non-profit organization targeted to help in these areas. Their mission is to "develop pathways to the creative economy for underrepresented youths in Los Angeles." Recently they have donated $3 million to people affected by COVID-19. In January 2017 The Wall Street Journal  reported that after the predicted March 2017 IPO for Snap Inc., Murphy and Evan Spiegel would hold over "70% of the voting power" in the company, and own around 45% of the total stock.

Controversy 
In 2014, emails sent by Spiegel during his time at Stanford were leaked to Gawker. The emails included misogynistic and homophobic comments, openly encouraged getting women heavily drunk in an attempt to convince them to have sex. The emails included comments about getting his friends laid by wasted "sororisluts", and shooting lasers at "fat girls". He was also encouraging underage drinking, an illegal activity that is common among college students.

Spiegel issued a statement responding to the controversy stating, "I'm obviously mortified and embarrassed that my idiotic emails during my fraternity days were made public. I have no excuse. I'm sorry I wrote them at the time and I was jerk to have written them. They in no way reflect who I am today or my views towards women."

Personal life
Spiegel began dating Australian model Miranda Kerr in 2015. They became engaged on July 20, 2016. They married in a private ceremony in Los Angeles on May 27, 2017. Just a month before Spiegel's engagement to Kerr, he purchased a 7,164 square foot, $12 million house that was previously owned by Harrison Ford. In May 2018, Kerr gave birth to their first child, a son. In October 2019, Kerr gave birth to their second son.

As of 2021, Spiegel was ranked number 55 on the Forbes 400 with $13.8 billion in wealth.

In 2017, Spiegel became one of the youngest public company CEOs at age 26 when Snap began trading in March. Spiegel is also a member of the Berggruen Institute's 21st Century Council.

In 2018, he and his son Hart received French citizenship through a clause in the naturalization laws that waives French residency requirements for applicants that contribute to the French culture or economy. In November 2022 he joined the board of directors for Gagosian Gallery.

Charity 
In the same year, he gave $20 million to Stockton Scholars, a scholarship program in Stockton, California.

In 2022, at the Otis College of Art and Design commencement, Spiegel announced that he and Miranda Kerr would pay off the 2022 graduating class's student debt.

References

American technology chief executives
American technology company founders
1990 births
Living people
American billionaires
Businesspeople from Los Angeles
American people of German descent
American Episcopalians
Crossroads School alumni
Stanford University alumni
People from Pacific Palisades, California
21st-century American businesspeople
Naturalized citizens of France